The Sea and the Rhythm is the second EP from Iron & Wine (a.k.a. Sam Beam), released on September 9, 2003 by Sub Pop Records. The song "The Sea and the Rhythm" was featured in the final episode of the first season of The O.C.

Track listing

Note: the timing for "The Sea and the Rhythm" and "The Night Descending" are erroneously switched on the packaging of some releases.

References

Iron & Wine albums
2003 EPs
Sub Pop EPs